Thomas de Grey may refer to:

 Thomas de Grey (1680–1765), MP for Norfolk 1715-27
 Thomas de Grey (1717–1781), MP for Norfolk 1764-74
 Thomas de Grey, 2nd Baron Walsingham (1748–1818), MP for Wareham 1774, Tamworth 1774-80 and Lostwithiel 1780-81
 Thomas de Grey, 2nd Earl de Grey (1781–1859), British Tory politician and statesman
Thomas de Grey, 4th Baron Walsingham (1788–1839), British peer
Thomas de Grey, 5th Baron Walsingham (1804–1870), British peer
 Thomas de Grey, 6th Baron Walsingham (1843–1919), English politician and amateur entomologist

See also

 Thomas Grey (disambiguation)